Ellwood is a hamlet in the Forest of Dean district in Gloucestershire, England. The hamlet has a football club Ellwood F.C. who play at Bromley Road.

References

External links

Forest of Dean
Hamlets in Gloucestershire